Salford Central railway station is in the city of Salford, Greater Manchester, England, close to Spinningfields and Deansgate. It is served by trains to and from Manchester Victoria, towards Rochdale and Wigan Wallgate.

History

The railway station opened on 29 May 1838 as a terminus on the Manchester and Bolton Railway and was originally named Salford railway station. In 1843, a connection to Manchester Victoria was built, carried on iron columns. The roof suffered from corrosion caused by the sulphurous emissions of locomotives passing through the station and one was replaced after only four years. Between April 1858 and August 1865, to avoid confusion with Salford (Oldfield Rd), the station was named Salford (New Bailey Street), after which it reverted to its original name of Salford.

To avoid confusion with the newly built Salford Crescent station, in 1988 it was renamed Salford Central. For many years the station was served at peak times only.

With only platforms 1 and 2 currently in use (platforms 3 and 4 have been disused since the early 1990s), the station is now managed by Northern Trains and has undergone a major transformation involving construction of a new ticket office as well as making the station building fully accessible by the use of ramps from the entrances to the ticket office and lifts and ramps from the ticket office to the platforms, however ramped access to the trains was not possible until the second renovation to the platforms in 2023.

Location
Manchester city centre is accessible either on foot or by a short ride on public transport. Salford is also served by Salford Crescent railway station, close to the University of Salford and Salford Precinct. The £700m Middlewood Locks development will be served by Salford Central.

Facilities
The ticket office is staffed from 06:25 to 19:35, six days per week (closed late evenings and on Sundays, so tickets must be purchased on the train at these times). The ticket hall is connected to the platforms via inclined ramps that are suitable for mobility-impaired users.  There are shelters and snack/drink vending machines at platform level, along with timetable posters, digital display screens and automated announcements to provide train running information.

Services
The station has a frequent service on weekdays and Saturdays (typically 5 tph each way), with all trains to and from Victoria calling here.

The station was formerly closed on Sundays, but since the summer 2018 timetable change was introduced on 20 May all trains between Salford Crescent and Victoria now call here.

Services were suspended from this station on 2 January 2023 until Summer 2023 so Network Rail can carry out improvement works, raising the canopies and platforms due to accessibility issues, as well as upgrading the track and the signalling system.

Future development
A Network Rail report suggests building platforms on the line to Liverpool (via ), the lines of which run through the station but are not provided with platforms.  This scheme has since been adopted by Transport for Greater Manchester and included in their Capital Works Programme for 2015–16 to 2020–21.  This will see an additional platform built and the old platforms 3 & 4 reopened, at a cost of £20.5 million and will allow Liverpool, Chester & Manchester Airport-bound trains (using the Ordsall Chord) to call here.

All lines through the station have now been electrified and electric working on the Preston via Bolton route commenced on Monday 11 February 2019 utilising Class 319 Electric Multiple Units.

References

Bibliography

External links

Railway stations in Salford
DfT Category E stations
Former Lancashire and Yorkshire Railway stations
Railway stations in Great Britain opened in 1838
Northern franchise railway stations